Eastern Railway Football Club (formerly known as both the East Bengal Railway FC and Eastern Bengal Railway FC) is an Indian institutional football club based in Kolkata, West Bengal. Founded in 1882, the club currently competes in the CFL Premier Division B. It previously participated and enjoyed success in the highest division of Calcutta Football League.

History

Founded as "East Bengal Railway Sports Club" in 1882, Eastern Railway has played in many top tournaments in India like the IFA Shield – where they won the then top tournament in 1944. The club later won All-India Railway Championship thrice. They clinched Calcutta Football League title in 1958, and became the first team outside the Big Three of Calcutta to win it. The club used to also be a force in the Durand Cup, making it into the finals of the 1927 tournament. They also won the Bordoloi Trophy in 1967. Eastern Railway was relegated from the CFL super division in 1985 after gaining thirteenth position.

In 2005, the club clinched Trades Cup title with win against Wari AC in final. In 2007, they reached the final of prestigious Trades Cup, but was defeated by then I-League side Chirag United 3–1.

Notable players
The club has been represented by many former India members including Syed Abdus Samad, Santosh Nandy, Sahu Mewalal, Pradip Kumar Banerjee, Pradyut Barman, Parimal Dey, Prasanta Sinha, Nikhil Nandy. Legendary Indian football coach Sushil Bhattacharya played for the club from 1950 to 1956, and later became coach of the team.

Honours

League
Calcutta Football League
Champions (1): 1958

Cup
IFA Shield
Champions (1): 1944
Runners-up (1): 1957

Durand Cup
Runners-up (1): 1927

Rovers Cup
Runners-up (1): 1949

DCM Trophy
Runners-up (2): 1953, 1957

Bordoloi Trophy
Champions (1): 1967
Runners-up (1): 1968

Sait Nagjee Football Tournament
Runners-up (1): 1958

Trades Cup
Champions (1): 2005
Runners-up (2): 2004, 2007

Darjeeling Gold Cup
Champions (1): 1978

Mohan Kumar Mangalam Football Tournament
Champions (1): 1980

Vivekananda Gold Cup
Champions (1): 2015

Other department

Field hockey
Eastern Railway has its field hockey team that competed in both the prestigious Beighton Cup and Calcutta Hockey League. They clinched Beighton Cup title in 1929. Legendary Indian footballer Shanti Mullick appeared with the club's women's hockey team.

 Beighton Cup
Champions (2): 1922, 1929
Runners-up (1): 1934

 Calcutta Hockey League
Champions (2): 2017, 2018

Cricket
In Eastern Railway, men's cricket has been practiced, and it is affiliated with the Cricket Association of Bengal (CAB). It participates in regional tournaments such as First Division League, and J.C. Mukherjee T-20 Trophy.

Volleyball
Eastern Railway's volleyball section (consisting both men's and women's teams) participates in the West Bengal State Senior Volleyball Championship and Khelo India Volleyball League. They have won both the 2021 and 2022 editions of the State Senior Volleyball Club Championship.

See also
Football in Kolkata
List of football clubs in India

References

Further reading

External links

Eastern Railway FC at Soccerway
Eastern Railway FC at BeSoccer

Association football clubs established in 1882
Football clubs in Kolkata
1882 establishments in India
Railway association football clubs in India